Centenary Hospital (officially Scarborough Health Network, Centenary Hospital) is a hospital in Scarborough, Toronto, Ontario, Canada. It was opened on July 1, 1967, and was named in honour of the 100th anniversary of Canada. Since 2016, the hospital is operated by the Scarborough Health Network.

History
The hospital opened on July 1, 1967, as Scarborough Centenary Hospital and was the second hospital in the township of Scarborough, after the Scarborough General Hospital. Expansions were constructed in 1986 and 1991, when it became known as Centenary Health Centre.

The hospital merged with the Ajax and Pickering General Hospital in 1998 to create the Rouge Valley Health System. Under the new network, the hospital was officially known as Rouge Valley Centenary.

On December 1, 2016, the Rouge Valley Health System dissolved as the campuses of The Scarborough Hospital (General and Birchmount) and Rouge Valley Centenary merged to form a new administration, the Scarborough Health Network. The Ajax and Pickering campus joined Lakeridge Health.

As of 2019, the Scarborough Health Network plans to reduce the number of hospital sites from three to two by 2031. In the three expansion options, the Centenary Hospital is planned for renovation while in two of the three options, the General and Birchmount hospitals are each considered for shutting down and replacement with a new hospital at a different site.

References

Hospital buildings completed in 1967
Hospitals in Toronto
Buildings and structures in Scarborough, Toronto
Hospitals affiliated with the University of Toronto
1967 establishments in Ontario